Hayter is a surname. Notable people with the surname include:

Adrian Hayter (1914–1990), New Zealand soldier, sailor, Antarctic leader and author
Alethea Hayter (1911–2006), English writer
Arthur Hayter, 1st Baron Haversham (1835–1917), British politician
Charles Hayter (1761–1835), English miniature painter
Charles Hayter (secretary) (died 1948), Australian football club manager and secretary
Charles Hayter, a minor character in the novel Persuasion by Jane Austen
David Hayter (born 1969), Canadian-American actor and screenwriter
Ernest Hayter (1913–2005), English cricketer
George Hayter (1792–1871), English painter
Harrison Hayter (1825–1898), British engineer
Henry Heylyn Hayter (1821–1895), Australian statistician
Jack Hayter, British musician
James Hayter (actor) (1907–1983), British actor
James Hayter (footballer) (born 1979), English footballer
James Hayter (rugby union) (born 1978), English former rugby union player
Joanna Hayter, Australian gender equality advocate and humanitarian aid worker
John Hayter (1800–1895), English painter
John Hayter (antiquary) (1756–1818), English churchman and academic
L. A. Hayter (1893–1917), English artist and vegetarianism activist
Montague Hayter (1871–1948), English cricketer
Paul Hayter (born 1942), senior British civil servant
Sean Hayter, Australian musician with the band Lucius Hunt
Stanley William Hayter (1901–1988), British painter
Sir William Hayter, 1st Baronet (1792–1878), British barrister and politician
William Hayter (diplomat) (1906–1995), British diplomat, ambassador to the Soviet Union and author
William Hayter (priest) (1858–1935), British dean and teacher

See also
George Albert Bazaine-Hayter (1843–1914), French general